The Miller's Daughter is a narrative poem by Alfred Tennyson, first printed in 1833 and significantly revised in 1842.

Textual history 

The poem was first published in 1833. It was greatly altered when republished in 1842, and in some respects, so Edward Fitzgerald thought, not for the better. No alterations of much importance were made in it after 1842. The characters as well as the scenery were, it seems, purely imaginary. Tennyson said that if he thought of any mill it was that of Trumpington, near Cambridge, which bears a general resemblance to the picture here given.

In the first edition the poem opened with the following stanza, which the Quarterly ridiculed:

Legacy 

The narrative contains the following love lyric, which Arthur Quiller-Couch included separately under the same title in the first (1900) and second (1939) editions of The Oxford Book of English Verse:

Translation 
An Arabic version of the extracted lyric above, translated by Safa Khulusi and entitled ابنة الطحان, was published in the Al-Risala Magazine, Issue 475, on 10 August 1942.

Notes

References

Bibliography 

 Collins, John Churton, ed. (1900). The Early Poems of Alfred, Lord Tennyson. London: Methuen & Co. pp. 58–68. 
 Tennyson, Hallam (1897). Alfred Lord Tennyson: A Memoir by his Son. Vol. 1. London: Macmillan and Co., Limited. pp. 117–118.

Poetry by Alfred, Lord Tennyson
1833 poems
1842 poems